John W. Gill (November 27, 1898 – March 4, 1997) was an American football coach.  Gill graduated from Western State Normal School (now known as Western Michigan University) in 1924 and became an assistant football coach under head coach Mike Gary.  At the time of the 1930 United States Census, Gill was living in Kalamazoo, Michigan, and his occupation was listed as a teacher at a college.  In 1939, Gill recommended that the Western Michigan athletic teams change their mascot from "Hilltoppers" to "Broncos," and his suggestion was adopted by the school.  Gill was awarded $10,000 for submitting the team's nickname, funds which he donated to the Waldo Stadium building fund.  He was the head football coach at Michigan College of Education for 11 years from 1942 to 1952.  He compiled a record of 50–34–1 as head coach, and his best season was 1948 when he led the Broncos to a 6–3 record as his team outscored opponents 199 to 106.  In 1952, Gill was appointed as the associated athletic director at Michigan College of Education.  He continued to serve in that capacity until his retirement in 1969.

Head coaching record

Football

References

External links
 

1898 births
1997 deaths
Western Michigan Broncos baseball coaches
Western Michigan Broncos football coaches
Western Michigan University alumni
People from Tuscola County, Michigan